Kyle Sherman (born March 2, 1994) is an American professional Ten-pin bowler from O'Fallon, Missouri. He currently competes on the PBA Tour. He is known for winning the 2019 Storm PBA/PWBA Striking Against Breast Cancer Mixed Doubles with Amanda Greene, and the 2022 PBA Cheetah Championship.

He is the co-creator of the "Brad and Kyle" YouTube channel along with fellow PBA bowler Brad Miller, currently with over 150,000 subscribers.

He is currently a member of Storm Products and Turbo Grips pro staffs.

Amateur career 

Sherman bowled for and attended college at Lindenwood University. He was a three-time collegiate All-American at Lindenwood, along with winning the 2014 Intercollegiate Team Championships title. He also won the 2014 Youth Open team Championship, and the Junior World Team Challenge.

He is a one-time member of Junior team USA (2015), and a two-time member of Team USA (2020 and 2021).

Professional career 
Sherman has been bowling on the PBA tour since 2016.

His first televised finals appearance came at the 2019 Roth/Holman Doubles Championship. He and Brad Miller qualified first during the qualifying portion and faced off against Matt Ogle and Sean Rash in the championship match, which they lost by scores of 213–200.

His second televised finals appearance came at the 2019 PBA World Series of Bowling Cheetah Championship, where he came in 2nd place, losing to Dick Allen 234–195.

On July 29, 2019, Sherman won his first PBA tour title during the PBA/PWBA Striking Against Breast Cancer Mixed Doubles tournament, partnered with Amanda Greene. They qualified in 5th place to advance to the stepladder finals, where they defeated Erin McCarthy and A.J Johnson in the championship match.

During the 2022 PBA Players Championship Southwest Qualifier, he faced off against his friend and doubles partner Brad Miller in the opening match, defeating him 213–205. Sherman continued through to the semi-finals where he eventually lost to Arturo Quintero.

Sherman won his second PBA tour title at the 2022 Cheetah Championship. He qualified 2nd in the event and faced Kris Koeltzow in the 3rd match, defeating him 216–212. In the championship match he bowled against Cristian Azcona, defeating him 214–184 to win his second title.

In 2019 and 2022, Sherman qualified for the PBA playoffs based on his consistency during the season. He lost in the second round in 2019, and the first round in 2022.

PBA Tour Titles 

 2019: Storm PBA/PWBA Striking Against Breast Cancer Mixed Doubles (Houston, TX)
 2022: PBA World Series of Bowling Cheetah Championship (Wauwatosa, WI)

Career statistics 
Statistics are through the last complete PBA season.

+CRA = Championship Round Appearances

References 

Living people
1992 births